Jam Jodhpur railway station is a small station in Jamnagar district, Gujarat. Its code is JDH. It serves Jam Jodhpur city. The station consists of two platforms. The platforms are not well sheltered. It lacks many facilities including water and sanitation.

Major trains
 Porbandar–Somnath Passenger
 Porbandar–Santragachi Kavi Guru Express
 Rajkot–Porbandar Express

References

Railway stations in Jamnagar district
Bhavnagar railway division